Remote and virtual tower (RVT) is a modern concept where the air traffic service (ATS) at an airport is performed somewhere other than in the local control tower. Although it was initially developed for airports with low traffic levels, in 2021 it was implemented at a major international airport, London City Airport (84,260 aircraft movements in 2019).

The first remote tower implementation providing aerodrome ATS was approved and introduced into operations in Sweden in April 2015, with further implementations in other EASA Member States well underway. In 2019, Scandinavian Mountains Airport in Dalarna, Sweden has been the world's first airport built without a traditional tower, to be controlled remotely.

The concept is also considered as contingency measures for major airports or for apron control only.

Concept
Instead of being located in an airport tower, the air traffic control officer (ATCO) or aerodrome flight information services officer (AFISO) work at a remote tower centre (RTC) from where they provide the ATS. The data comes from airport cameras and sensors rather than from an out-of-window view, which is reconstructed as a high-resolution video panorama on a large screen or series of screens.

The RVT concept is aiming at providing:

 Remote tower services at small and medium size airports, by personnel located at a remote tower centre somewhere else.
 Contingency services at major airports, in the case of fire or other events which could take place at the control tower building. The contingency facility should be at safe, nearby, but different physical location.
 Synthetic augmentation of vision to increase situational awareness at airports during poor visibility conditions at the local airport control tower facilities.

The full range of air traffic services defined in ICAO Documents 4444, 9426 and EUROCONTROL's Manual for AFIS will still be provided remotely by an ATCO or AFISO. The airspace users should be provided with the appropriate level of services as if the ATS were provided locally at the airport.

The SESAR Joint Undertaking projects are looking at RVT concepts, based on either one person controlling one airport, or one person controlling multiple airports.

Modes of operation
 Single remote tower: air traffic controller(s) control a single aerodrome.
 Multiple remote tower operations (MRTO): one or more operators are controlling more than one aerodrome at the same time (simultaneously) or in sequence.
 Contingency tower: to be used in case the traditional airport tower is unserviceable (e.g. fire), to provide basic level of service. A world's first, Heathrow's Virtual Contingency facility (VCF), unveiled in 2009, housed away from the airfield in a windowless room, can operate at up to 70% of its flights.
 Supplementary remote tower: an extra tower in to provide an unobstructed view for a new runway in case of airport expansion.

Beginnings
In 1996, at a scientific colloquium of the DLR Institute of Flight Guidance, Kraiss and Kuhlen proposed a "Virtual Holography" concept for ATC with a projected virtual workbench showing the aerodrome traffic in 3D that could be observed at any angle by the air traffic controller.

In 2001, a "Virtual Tower (ViTo)" concept won the DLR's first Visionary Projects (Wettbewerb der Visionen, WdV) competition with €200,000 awarded for the first two years of research, beginning in 2002. The idea described a remote ATC control room with video-sensor based surveillance instead of 'out-of-the-window' view from a real tower. The initial trials of remote ATS, for low and medium-density airports, have been based on optical sensors (cameras), providing the ATCOs at the RTC with a high-quality real-time image of the runway, the airport apron (ramp) and the very nearby airspace. These real-time images are displayed at large monitors providing up to 360-degree view.

Beside the live video feed from the airport, the ATCOs have available the same air traffic management computer systems as they would have in a local control tower building, being voice communication systems, meteorological systems, flight plan systems, and Surveillance display systems. The level of equipage might depend on whether it is a controlled TWR service, or a Flight Information Service being provided at the specific airport. Depending on the complexity of the airport, the traffic densities, and weather conditions, it might be preferable to complement the optical images with an advanced surface movement guidance and control system (A-SMGCS) with signal inputs from surface movement radar (SMR) and/or Local Area Multilateration (LAM).

Development and validation
The RVT concept is under development, besides of other former research & development initiatives (e.g. by DLR, DFS, LFV, Searidge Technologies, SAAB, FREQUENTIS, Indra Sistemas or the FP6 EU project ART, etc.), as part of the SESAR Joint Undertaking (SJU), where Work Package 6 develops the operational concepts, while Work Package 12 develops the corresponding technology to enable the RVT functionality. Live validation trials were planned at a few selected airports in Germany, Spain (ENAIRE), Norway (Avinor) and Sweden (LFV) as part of SESAR Joint Undertaking Projects 06.08.04 and 06.09.03 during the years 2012–2015.

Airservices Australia intended to evaluate RVT technology from Saab Group at Alice Springs airport in Central Australia from late 2012, with the control centre placed in Adelaide. In 2019, Airservices Australia selected Searidge as the provider for Digital Aerodrome Services Program at Sydney Airport (SYD) and possibly other Australian aerodromes, to start digital tower trials in 2020.

In March 2009, Saab Group and LFV carried out a live shadow mode demonstration of their existing remote tower concept. This demonstration took place at a remote tower centre facility established at Malmö air traffic control centre (ATCC), controlling a flight in and out of Ängelholm airport (ICAO:ESTA) in southern Sweden. As a contingency mechanism during this trial, the local control tower at Ängelholm was staffed by ATCOs.

In 2010 DLR carried out the first human in the loop remote tower center simulation, whereas a remote controller operated traffic at two different low frequented airports simultaneously. Despite several biases the controllers' situation awareness was over-average and their workload remained in average range and operational feasibility could be shown the first time.

DLR Institute of Flight Guidance, Saab Group, LVF, Indra and DFS have been the major driving forces behind the Remote Tower development, and are all represented in the SESAR Joint Undertaking projects, SAAB through North European ATM Industry Group (NATMIG) and LFV NORACON.

During ATC Global in Amsterdam in 8–10 March 2011, SESAR Joint Undertaking had a ceremony where Project 6.9.3 'Remote & Virtual Tower' was given the award for 'most advanced for deployment'. The prize was presented by Executive Director of SESAR Joint Undertaking, Mr Patrick Ky, and received by Project 6.9.3 Project Manager Mr Göran Lindqvist, NORACON.

In June 2016, Irish Aviation Authority was granted SESAR Joint Undertaking funding for remote tower demonstration. Upon validating single mode operations, the project tested multiple remote tower operations (MRTO) to provide services for Shannon and Cork simultaneously. The Dublin-based centre used SAAB-engineered technology.

In Scotland, Highlands and Islands Airports Limited (HIAL) plans to relocate 5 of their 11 towers (Inverness, 31,338 aircraft movements in 2019; Dundee, 43,354 a/c movements; Sumburgh, 18,056 a/c movements; Kirkwall, 14,247 a/c movements; Stornoway, 9444 a/c movements in 2019) to a remote tower centre in Inverness. The Combined Surveillance Centre (CSC) £34 million project is the largest in the UK. The first airport is expected to be operational in 2023, the last in 2027.

RVT in operation
As of 21 April 2015 12:00 am, the airport of Örnsköldsvik/Gideå (OER/ESNO) is run using remote ATC services from Sundsvall/Midlanda (SDL/ESNN). This is reported to be the first production deployment of RVT in the world. The system was tested at Leesburg Executive Airport in summer 2015.

In December 2019, a new airport (Scandinavian Mountains Airport, SCR/ESKS) was opened in Sweden without any traditional tower, being the first airport with only virtual tower (operated from Sundsvall).

On 1 October 2015 the FAA announced Northern Colorado Regional Airport (FNL/KFNL) (formerly known as Fort Collins-Loveland Municipal Airport) as the first official FAA approved Virtual Air Traffic Control Tower test site in the United States. The equipment and Searidge Technologies Remote Tower System were installed at the airport in 2018-2019, with initial testing and assessments of the new virtual technology commencing shortly thereafter. Plans for certification and opening of the remote tower in 2023 have been delayed due to COVID-19.

On 13 December 2018, the first in the UK remote tower at Digital Air Traffic Control Centre opened at Cranfield Airport (EGTC). The technology was supplied by SAAB and air traffic controllers were located in a building 400 yards away from the old tower.

On 20 October 2020, Avinor opened a remote control tower center situated in Bodø, Norway, as a cost effective solution intended for STOLports in Norway with little traffic. The remote tower technology is planned to be rolled out to a total of 15 airports in Norway by the end of 2022. The first airport to be controlled from there was Vardø Airport (750 km away) on 7. oktober 2020. As of October 2022, 8 airports were remotely controlled from this center, having about a year delayed plan.

London City Airport (LCY/EGLC) switched to remote ATC provided by NATS from their centre in Swanwick in early 2021.

Standardisation 
In 2014 the European Organisation for Civil Aviation Equipment (EUROCAE) founded the Working Group (WG) 100 "Remote and Virtual Tower". The WG-100 was launched under the Chair of the German Aerospace Center - DLR and EUROCONTROL in the Secretary role. WG-100 further consists of active contributors (air navigation service manufacturers & service providers) from more than 30 companies worldwide and acts in close coordination with EASA, ICAO, SESAR, and the most recent SESAR2020 project "PJ05 Remote Tower". The group was tasked as a first step to develop standards for remote towers optical systems. In September 2016 the ED-240 Minimum Aviation System Performance Specification for Remote Tower Optical Systems document was published. These MASPS are applicable to all optical sensor configurations (visible, as well as infrared spectrum) to be used for the implementation of the remote provision of ATS to an aerodrome, encompassing the whole chain from sensor to display. This standard should help vendors and customers to quantify an optimal operational system performance and to verify it in a standardised way.

Subsequently, the WG-100 work focused on an extension of the previous MASPS (revision A) to include 'visual tracking' and automatic Pan-Tilt-Zoom (PTZ) camera object following technologies. 'Visual tracking' is understood as the augmentation of the display of objects on the visual presentation by using information obtained only by image processing of the video from the optical sensors for the purpose of increasing the operator's situation awareness. The PTZ Object Following function attaches the PTZ camera to a moving target and persistently follows and displays it automatically. The MASPS ED-240A have been published on 13 November 2018.

In February 2019, EASA published Guidance Material on remote aerodrome air traffic services, outlining operational context, single and multiple modes of operation, system and training considerations, management of change, and possible impact on airspace users. The material includes checklists for implementation and operational use.

In January 2021, the Civil Air Navigation Services Organization (CANSO) published CANSO Guidance Material for Remote and Digital Towers, containing definitions, background and technology information, challenges and benefits, four case studies and guidance on starting remote tower operations.

Possible benefits
The main benefit of RVT is expected to be cost efficiency.

The cost savings originate from the following factors:

 No need to build and maintain control tower buildings and facilities at the local airports. The building and operational costs of a remote tower and facilities are much lower compared to a traditional tower.
 More efficient use of human resources (ATCOs and AFISOs), especially by serving multiple airports with medium to low traffic levels from a centralised location. 
 Reduced need to establish and maintain ATM systems locally at the airports. By using data communication networks from the local airport to the remote tower centre, several technical systems can be centralised, hence costs savings are possible. Over 75% of regional airports with fewer than 1 million passengers a year are making a loss. These costs could be shared, saving 1.3 million euro per year (in case of Shannon and Cork airports being controlled from Dublin).

There is also a great potential to better and more cost efficiently serve flights which either are scheduled outside the core opening hours of the airport, or by being able to serve non-scheduled traffic (ambulance flights and search-and-rescue helicopters) with an air traffic service during night time when a smaller airports would normally be closed.

In comparison to early cost-benefit calculations (e.g. by LFV-ROT in 2008), improvements in technology made the concept even more feasible, e.g. video adopted the HD standard and the cost of high-resolution cameras decreased from over €10,000 to less than €5,000 circa 2018.

Airports with low traffic levels can be controlled simultaneously (Multiple Remote Tower Operations – MRTO), like at the Remote Tower Centre concept at Dublin Airport to provide air traffic services for located over 100 miles away Cork (21,442 aircraft movements in 2019) and Shannon (13,151 movements in 2019). In 2016, total movements were 50,242. Compared to a traditional tower, MRTO for Shannon and Cork in Ireland was anticipated to provide savings of four air traffic control officer’s (ATCO) salaries (£400,000/year) and lower maintenance and build costs (saving £800,000/year).

Controversy
Savings expressed in terms of controller salaries raise redundancy concerns. In Scotland, HIAL's air traffic staff at 4 affected airports are expected to relocate from the islands to the new remote centre in Inverness, but only 11% (6 out of 54 survey responses) of employees want to take up employment at the new centre, with some of those considering daily commuting instead of relocation. The Prospect trade union representing air traffic controllers in the UK assessed the plans as having "very significant negative impacts" on the local economy if the centralisation plans go ahead, with 48 staff at the risk of redundancy (£2.2 million gross annual salaries) at "very significant expense to the taxpayer".

The International Federation of Air Traffic Controllers' Associations (IFATCA) is critical of the multiple simultaneous mode of operation due to limitations of trials: all simulated scenarios are selected samples of reality with possible blind spots, and present incoherent results. The workload study is also missing, and the savings for aerodromes and airlines are uncertain.

In 2020, European Cockpit Association (ECA) did not support multiple mode of operations for similar reasons, citing more research required "of human factors, operational and technical implications and adequate mitigation measures". Since very few air traffic controllers held ratings for more than one tower, the impact of changing airports, procedures and weather conditions in one shift on situational awareness had not been adequately studied, and such frequent changes might cause errors and decrease safety of operations.

While some may argue, there are strong similarities between the concept of RVT, and the criteria for disruptive innovations as defined by Clayton Christensen and Michael Raynor in the book "Innovators Solution". A closer examination of the technology and its practical use would indicate that it is more appropriately categorized as a sustainable innovation, marking an evolution in aerodrome control by supplanting visual observation with a surveillance system.

References 

 N. Fürstenau, "Virtual Reality for Integration, Proc. 12th Scientific Seminar: The Challenges of Integration", DLR, Inst. of Flight Guidance, 30.-31.Oct. 2002, to be published as DLR-Mitteilung, www.dlr.de/
 N. Fürstenau, M. Rudolph, M. Schmidt, B. Werther, Virtual Tower, in: "Wettbewerb der Visionen 2001 – 2004", Hrsg. Deutsches Zentrum für Luft-und Raumfahrt (2004) pp. 16 – 21
 N. Fürstenau, Virtual Tower, 5th ATM R&D Symposium (DLR, Eurocontrol, EC), Braunschweig, 11.-13.10. 2005 http://atmsymposium.dlr.de 
 Möhlenbrink, C., Papenfuß, A., & Jakobi, J. (2012). The Role of Workload for Work Organisation in a Remote Tower Control Center. Air Traffic Control Quarterly, 20(1), 5-26.

External links 
 EASA Guidance Material on remote aerodrome air traffic services (2019)
 UK Civil Aviation Authority regulatory requirements
 Remote & Digital Towers (Special Bulletin Series 2020/21) by ATC Network

Air traffic control
Remote control
2001 introductions
2002 establishments in Germany
German inventions